Snail racing is a form of humorous entertainment that involves the racing of two or more air-breathing land snails. Usually the common garden snail species Cornu aspersum is used. This species is native to Europe, but has been accidentally introduced to many countries all over the world.

There are numerous snail racing events that take place in different places around the world, though the majority take place in the United Kingdom.

Snail races usually take place on a circular track with the snails starting in the middle and racing to the perimeter.  The track usually takes the form of a damp cloth atop a table. The radius is traditionally set at 13 or 14 inches.  Racing numbers are painted on the shells or small stickers or tags are placed on them to distinguish each competitor.

Competitions

The annual "World Snail Racing Championships" started in Congham, Norfolk in the 1960s after founder Tom Elwes witnessed a snail racing event in France.  The 1995 race saw the setting of the benchmark time of two minutes by a snail named Archie. The 2007 event had to be cancelled when the course was waterlogged by a prolonged period of heavy rain, only days after the death of Elwes. The 2008 World Championships was won by Heikki Kovalainen, a snail named after the Formula One racing driver, in a time of three minutes, two seconds. The 2010 World Championship was won by a snail called Sidney in a time of three minutes and 41 seconds.

The first official competitive live snail race in London, the "Guinness Gastropod Championship" held in 1999, was commentated by horse racing pundit John McCririck who started the race with the words "Ready, Steady, Slow". This became common terminology for the start of a race. The following year Guinness featured a snail race in their advertisement Bet on Black as part of their "Good things come to those who wait" campaign. The advert won the silver award at the Cannes Lions International Advertising Festival and was self-parodied for their "Extra Cold" campaign several years later.

The "Grand Championship Snail Race" began in Cambridgeshire in 1992 in the village of Snailwell as part of its annual summer fête.  It regularly attracts up to 400 people to the village, more than doubling its usual population.

Snail Around The World
Snail Racing may also refer to measuring how fast a snail can go across a distance, usually the world; without stopping and in a strait line. 
A common source of this info is informational tv shows such as Curiosity Show.

In popular culture
 Season 3 of the Nickelodeon animated series SpongeBob SquarePants features an episode called "The Great Snail Race," in which the title character trains his pet snail Gary to compete in a snail race.
 The 2013 animated film Turbo, produced by DreamWorks Animation, is based on the concept of snail racing.
In the 2015 video game Undertale, there is a minigame of snail racing when the player interacts with a ghost named Napstablook.

References

External links
Video about the World Snail Racing Championships
World Snail Racing Championships, snailracing.net

Animal racing
Gastropods and humans